Rear Admiral Edward Courtney "Ted" Thorne,  (29 October 1923 – 23 October 2013) was a senior Royal New Zealand Navy officer. He rose to be Chief of Naval Staff and later served as the Commissioner of the New Zealand Fire Service.

Biography
Thorne was born in Seatoun, Wellington, on 29 October 1923 and was educated at Rongotai College from 1935 to 1938, followed by Nelson College from 1938 to 1941.  After leaving school, he travelled to England, becoming a cadet at Dartmouth. His training included time in the cruiser Hawkins and during the war he served in vessels including the heavy cruiser Devonshire and the destroyer Lamerton.

Following the Second World War, Thorne spent time with the Royal Navy 2nd Minesweeping Squadron and returning to New Zealand he served in Taupo, Bellona and Kaniere. He was in command of the naval radio station at Waiouru on Christmas Eve 1953 when news of the nearby Tangiwai disaster came through, and he led naval personnel in the ensuing recovery operation. In 1972 he was promoted to rear admiral and was appointed New Zealand's Chief of Naval Staff. Following his retirement from the navy, he was appointed the first commissioner of the New Zealand Fire Service.

He died in Auckland on 23 October 2013.

Honours and decorations
In 1953, Thorne was awarded the Queen Elizabeth II Coronation Medal. In the 1972 New Year Honours, he was appointed a Commander of the Order of the British Empire. Thorne was appointed a Companion of the Order of the Bath in the 1975 Queen's Birthday Honours.

References

External links
1992 biographical interview

1923 births
2013 deaths
New Zealand Companions of the Order of the Bath
New Zealand Commanders of the Order of the British Empire
New Zealand military personnel of World War II
People educated at Nelson College
Royal New Zealand Navy admirals
People from Wellington City
People educated at Rongotai College